"Chewing Gum" is a song by Norwegian singer Annie from her debut studio album, Anniemal (2004). Written by Richard X and Hannah Robinson, the song is based on metaphor which likens men to chewing gum.

The song was released as the album's lead single on 30 August 2004. It received positive reviews from music critics. "Chewing Gum" was the album's most commercially successful single, reaching number eight on the Norwegian Singles Chart and number 25 on the UK Singles Chart.

Background and writing
Producer Richard X was impressed with Annie's debut single "The Greatest Hit". He asked Annie to record vocals for his debut album Richard X Presents His X-Factor Vol. 1. In exchange, he contributed "Chewing Gum", co-written with Hannah Robinson, to Anniemal. Richard X's songwriting was inspired by a put-down that his girlfriend devised to describe self-important, vain people.

The song's lyrics compare being in a relationship with chewing gum, "chewing for fun" and then moving on to the next relationship "when all the flavor has gone." Annie compared the song's sound to the work of new wave group the Tom Tom Club. Reviewers compared "Chewing Gum" to the group's 1981 single "Genius of Love".

Critical reception
"Chewing Gum" received very positive reviews from music critics. Pitchfork ranked the track at number 11 on its list of the "Top 50 Singles of 2004". Stylus Magazine listed it tenth on its list of the top 40 singles of 2004. The song was listed 31st on the 2004 Pazz & Jop list, a survey of several hundred music critics conducted by Robert Christgau.

Music video
The music video for "Chewing Gum" was directed by Barnaby Roper. In it, two versions of Annie sing the lyrics to each other as part of a dialogue. The video includes sequences of Annie and body doubles of her dancing in a sound stage. The video was filmed in less than a day.

Track listings
 UK CD1 
 "Chewing Gum" (radio edit) – 3:30
 "Kiss Me"

 UK CD2 
 "Chewing Gum" (radio edit) – 3:30
 "Chewing Gum" (Mylo remix) – 5:54
 "Chewing Gum" (Headman vocal remix) – 6:29
 "Chewing Gum" (Headman dub) – 6:31
 "Chewing Gum" (video)

 UK 12-inch single 
 "Chewing Gum" (Mylo remix)
 "Chewing Gum" (album version)
 "Chewing Gum" (Headman dub)

Personnel
 Annie – lead vocals
 Big Active – art direction
 Henrik Bülow – photography
 Pete Hofmann – engineering, mixing
 Hannah Robinson – backing vocals
 Richard X – production

Charts

Release history

In popular culture
The song has been featured on the online game Audition Online and an update trailer for the online game Blockland as well as in television programmes such as Glee, Skam, and Grey's Anatomy. The song was also featured in the film Big Momma's House 2.

References

2004 singles
2004 songs
679 Artists singles
Annie (singer) songs
Song recordings produced by Richard X
Songs written by Hannah Robinson
Songs written by Richard X